Los Angeles County Treasurer and Tax Collector bills, collects, invests, borrows,  safeguards and disburses monies and properties in Los Angeles County. The Los Angeles County Board of Supervisors appoints the treasurer to this position.

The previous treasurer was Joseph Kelly. The current treasurer is Keith Knox.

External links
 Homepage

Treasurer and Tax Collector